Soleil Productions is a French publisher of both original and imported comic books.

History
Soleil was founded in 1989 in Toulouse.

Soleil quickly became known as a publisher of cartoons and parodies such as  Rahan, Blek le Roc et Tarzan. It soon went into the heroic fantasy.

In the 1994, it picked up and published the Lanfeust comic series. Lanfeust became a rapid and huge success and propelled the Toulouse publishing house to the rank of the largest French comic book publishers.

Partnerships and collaborations
In 2004, Soleil and Delcourt created a joint venture called DelSol, a partnership distribution society for France, Belgium and other Francophone countries.

In 2008, Marvel Comics collaborated with the publisher on English translations of several of their titles, including Sky Doll, Universal War One, Samurai: Legend, Scourge of the Gods and Ythaq: The Forsaken World. 

In 2008, Panini and Soleil created a joint venture called Fusion Comics in order to diffuse some U.S. comics (like Dark Tower or World of Warcraft) into the French-language countries market.

List of current titles

Bandes dessinées

Original and licensed properties published under the labels Soleil, Quadrants, Soleil Levant, Soleil Celtic, Start, Métamorphose, etc.

 Aberzen (4 issues)
 Les Ailes du Phaéton (9 issues)
 Akron (1 issue)
 Aleph (3 issues)
 Angeline (4 issues)
 Angor (3 issues)
 Les Arcanes du Midi-Minuit (8 issues)
 L'Assassin Royal (5 issues)
 Atalante (4 issues)
 Les Aventures du Gottferdom Studio (4 issues)
 Bad Legion (1 issue)
 Billy Brouillard (1 issue)
 Le Bleu du ciel (2 issues)
 Les Blondes (14 issues)
 Les Brumes d'Asceltis (3 issues)
 Cañari (2 issues)
 Les Carnets Secrets du Vatican (3 issues)
 Cixi de Troy (3 issue)
 Les Conquérants de Troy (2 issues)
 CrossFire (5 issues)
 Le Dernier Troyen (6 issues)
 Les Échaudeurs des Ténèbres (2 issues)
 Le Feul (3 issues)
 Les Feux d'Askell (3 issues)
 Le Fléau des Dieux (6 issues)
 La Geste des Chevaliers-Dragons (12 issues)
 Le Grimoire de Féerie (2 issues)
 Héroïc Pizza (5 issues)
 Hana Attori (3 issues)
 Husk (4 issues)
 les Insurgés d’Edaleth (3 issues)
 Kookaburra, K, Universe (6+2+10 issues)
 Lanfeust de Troy (8 issues)
 Lanfeust des Etoiles (8 issues)
 Lanfeust Odyssey (2 issue)
 Léo Loden (20 issues)
 Luuna (7 issues)
 La Marche du Crabe (2 issues)
 Marlysa (11 issues)
 Moréa (6 issues)
 Les Naufragés d'Ythaq (9 issues)
 Nocturnes Rouges (6 issues)
 One of Us (2 issues)
 Paradis Perdu (7 issues)
 Rahan (22 issues)
 Servitude (3 issues)
 Sha (3 issues)
 Sky Doll (4 issues)
 Slhoka (4 issues)
 Le Syndrome de Caïn (5 issues)
 Trolls de Troy (12 issues)
 UW1 (6 issues)
 Verseau (2 issues)
 Yiu (7 issues)
 Zéro Absolu (3 issues)
 Zorn & Dirna (3 issues)

Comics

(Licensed properties)
Published by Soleil / Fusion Comics:

 Breathe (1 issue)
 Buffy contre les vampires, Saison une (2 issues)
 Buffy contre les vampires, Saison huit (4 issues)
 Conan (8 Issues)
 Danger Girl (2 Issues)
 Emily the Strange (2 issues)
 The Federal Vampire and Zombie Agency (1 issue)
 GameKeeper (1 issue)
 Gears of War (1 issue)
 Jackie Foxxx (1 issue)
 MetalGear Solid (2 issues)
 Ramayan (2 issues)
 Révélations (3 issues)
 7 Brothers (2 issues)
 Snake Woman (1 issue)
 La Tour Sombre (5 issues)
 TransFormers (2 issues)
 Voodoo Child (2 issues)
 Wanderers (1 issue)
 Warhammer (6 issues)
 WarHammer 40 000 (6 issues)
 World of Warcraft (5 issues)
 X-Files (1 issue)

Manga and manhwa

(Licensed & original properties)
Published by Végétal Manga / Soleil Manga

 Advent (2 issues)
 Akari (8 issues)
 Azamaru (4 issues)
 Ange, Mode d'Emploi (6 issues)
 B-Boy Bomb (6 issues)
 Battle Royale (15 issues)
 Blitz Royale (2 issues)
 Beauty Pop (8 issues)
 Burning Moon (4 issues)
 Bienvenue dans la N.H.K. (7 issues)
 Blank (3 issues)
 Blood Rain (9 issues)
 Bus for Spring (3 issues)
 Castlevania (2 issues)
 C'était nous (12 issues)
 Complex (7 issues)
 Cyber idol Mink (6 issues)
 Δ Saga (2 issues)
 Les Dessins de la Vie (1 issue)
 Diabolo (3 issues)
 Doors of Chaos (2 issues)
 Don Dracula (2 issues)
 Dorohedoro (7 issues)
 Les Enfants de Saphir (1 issue)
 L'Escadrille des Nuages (4 issues)
 F - the Perfect Insider (1 issue)
 Full Set (3 issues)
 God Save the Queen (1 issue)
 Gothic Sports (3 issues)
 Hakoniwa Angel (4 issues)
 Hello Harajuku Story (1 issue)
 Higanjima (8 issues)
 High School Girls (9 issues)
 High School Paradise (11 issues)
 Iron Wok Jan ! R (4 issues)
 Itadakimasu (4 issues)
 Kamui, end of Ark
 Kana & Kanji (4 issues)
 Le Labyrinthe de Morphée (1 issue)
 Lanfeust Quest (5 issues)
 Larmes de Samouraï (2 issues)
 The Legend of Zelda: Oracle of Seasons and Oracle of Ages (2 issues)
 Lives (2 issues)
 Living in a Happy World (2 issues)
 Love instruction - How to become a seductor (3 issues)
 Loveless (8 issues)
 Lovey Dovey (5 issues)
 Ma Petite Maitresse (4 issues)
 MegaCity 909 (2 issues)
 Pita-Ten (8 issues)
 Princesse Saphir (3 issues)
 Samurai Champloo (2 issues)
 The Tarot Café (3 issues)
 Triton (3 issues)
 Venus Versus Virus (2 issues)
 Warcraft : Le Puits Solaire (3 issues)

Periodicals

 Lanfeust Mag (monthly - since 1998), (#144 in November 2008)

Artbooks and collectibles

 Les Filles de Soleil (13 issues)

See also
 Franco-Belgian publishing houses
 List of Franco-Belgian comic series

Notes

References

External links
Official WebSite 
Periodical Website 
Manga WebSite 
Soleil Comics Hub on Marvel WebSite 
SoleilPedia 

Comic book publishing companies of France
Privately held companies of France
French companies established in 1982
Publishing companies established in 1982
Mass media in Toulon